Sai Kung Tang Shiu Kin Sports Ground is a rugby union stadium on Fuk Man Road, Sai Kung, New Territories, Hong Kong. It is managed by the Leisure and Cultural Services Department of the Hong Kong Government.

The sports ground includes a football field and a running track and holds 5,000 spectators. It is the home ground of Sai Kung Stingrays Rugby Club. The sports ground is located near the Sai Kung bus terminus.

Facilities
 Covered grandstand
 Standard running track
 Natural grass football field

References

External links
 Leisure and Cultural Services Department - Sai Kung Tang Shiu Kin Sports Ground

Sports venues in Hong Kong
Sai Kung Town
Football venues in Hong Kong